Football Queensland Metro is a Football Queensland administrative zone encompassing the greater Brisbane area in Queensland, Australia, with surrounding areas including Caboolture, Ipswich, Redland City and Logan City. The premier men's football competition is the Football Queensland Premier League 3 − Metro and the premier women's football competition is the Football Queensland Women's Premier League 3 − Metro. The administrative zone also has a numerous variety of lower divisions for both men and women, as well as academy and junior competitions to develop football (soccer) and fitness within the region. 

The administrative zone also encompasses teams competing in state competitions, along with Brisbane Roar and Brisbane Roar Women − Queensland's only teams participating in A-League Men and A-League Women. The zone is often divided into northern and southern sections for academy and junior competitions for ease of travel and other expenses. 

The zone was renamed in 2021 from its predecessor − Football Brisbane − which was formed in 2007 with the amalgamation of a variety of Football associations. These being Brisbane Men's Football, Brisbane Women's Soccer Association, Brisbane North & Districts Junior Soccer Association Brisbane Southern Districts Junior Soccer Association and Soccer Australia Referees (Brisbane). Prior to the establishment of Football Queensland in 2007, Football in Brisbane acted as the highest level of football (soccer) in the state. Football Queensland Metro is descended from the Anglo-Queensland Football Association, formed in May 1884.

The Football Queensland Metro Pyramids

Men's Pyramid 
The Football Queensland Premier League 3 − Metro competition is the fourth tier in the Football Queensland pyramid and the fifth tier in the Australian pyramid. Each respective competition has its own reserve league primarily for senior academy players.

Women's Pyramid 
The Football Queensland Women's Premier League 3 − Metro competition is the fourth tier in the Football Queensland pyramid and the fifth tier in the Australian pyramid. Each respective competition has its own reserve league primarily for senior academy players.

Antecedent Governing Bodies

See also 
Football (soccer) in Australia
Football (soccer) in Queensland
History of association football in Brisbane, Queensland

References

External links 
 
 

 
Football Queensland